Guy William Sockrider Jr. (November 5, 1921 – February 25, 2011) was an American politician. He served as a Democratic member of the Louisiana State Senate.

Life and career
Born in Jennings, Louisiana, the son of Myrtle Clarke and Guy William Sockrider Sr, Sockrider attended the Jennings High School, graduating in 1938. He volunteered for the army in 1942, and served as a captain in the 89th infantry division of the United States Army and the United States Army Reserve.

In 1948, Sockrider was elected to the Louisiana State Senate, succeeding  James O. Dolby and serving until 1964, when he did not seek re-election.  He was co-author of legislation establishing the W. O. Moss Regional Hospital and upgrading McNeese State University to university status. In 1949, he established the Industrial Construction Company.

Sockrider died in February 2011 at a hospital in Lake Charles, Louisiana, at the age of 89. He was buried in Prien Memorial Park.

References 

1921 births
2011 deaths
People from Jennings, Louisiana
Democratic Party Louisiana state senators
20th-century American politicians
Politicians from Lake Charles, Louisiana
Businesspeople from Louisiana
United States Army officers
Burials in Louisiana